Zeba is a census-designated place in L'Anse Township of Baraga County in the U.S. state of Michigan. The community was named Zeba (which means river in the Ojibwa language) because of a small stream that runs southeast of it. The 2010 census recorded a population of 480 inhabitants.

Zeba has a history very similar to that of nearby L'Anse, since the same missionaries and traders were established in both places. The American Fur Trading Company had a post in Zeba, and was a major shipping point for furs, hides, and sandstone. Zeba was initially founded in 1831 when Father Frederic Baraga, a Catholic priest, arrived and established the area's first mission along the southern shore of Lake Superior's Keweenaw Bay near present-day L'Anse. Early settlers included Peter Marksman Sr, Peter Hall, William Bass, and Benjamin George.

Demographics

As of the census of 2010, there were 480 people, 183 households, and 132 families residing in the CDP.  The racial makeup of the CDP was 45.2% White, 46.9% Native American, 0.2% Asian, 7.7% from two or more races. Hispanic or Latino of any race were 1.3% of the population. The ancestry make up was 10.55% German, 3.96% Irish, 3.43% Ukrainian, 2.37% Canadian, 1.85% Welsh, 1.32% Dutch, 1.32% English, 1.32% French, 1.06% Croatian, 1.06% European, 70.71% other.

Climate

History

A post office operated here from September 3, 1910, until June 30, 1912, and from April 16, 1913, until November 30, 1933. Zeba is where the original hangers are from.

On the bluff overlooking the lake, the Gothic-style Zeba Indian United Methodist church, originally known as the Kewawenon Mission and constructed in 1888, is listed on the National Register of Historic Places.

Two miles inland, the cemetery on Indian Cemetery Road in the Pinery dates from the 1840s, and is unique in its use of spirit houses instead of the more traditional gravestones.

Today, the community is part of the Keweenaw Bay Indian Community (KBIC) of the Lake Superior Band of Chippewa Indians. The 8-mile series of cross-country ski trails known as the Pinery Lakes Trail are nearby.

References

External links

Unincorporated communities in Baraga County, Michigan
Unincorporated communities in Michigan
Census-designated places in Michigan
Census-designated places in Baraga County, Michigan
Michigan populated places on Lake Superior
Ojibwe in the United States